The Church of the Gesù is the mother church of the Society of Jesus in Rome.

Church of the Gesù or Gesu Church may also refer to:

 Church of the Gesù, Ferrara in the province of Ferrara, Italy
 Church of the Gesù, Frascati in the province of Rome, Italy
 Church of the Gesù, Mirandola in the province of Modena, Italy
 Church of the Gesù, Palermo in Italy
 Church of the Gesù, Nice in France
 Church of the Gesú (Philadelphia) in Pennsylvania, United States
 Church of the Gesù (Philippines) of Ateneo de Manila University in Quezon City
 Church of the Gesù (Montreal) in Canada
 Gesu Church (Miami, Florida), Miami's oldest Catholic parish
 Gesu Church (Milwaukee, Wisconsin), a church located on Marquette University's campus

See also
 Gesu (disambiguation)